This page is a list of the hat-tricks scored for Japan's national football team. Besides the instances of a player scoring three goals in a game, the list also includes games where a player has scored more than three goals.

Goalscorer

Statistic

Notes

References

Hat-tricks
Japan
Japan